The National Medal of Technology and Innovation (formerly the National Medal of Technology) is an honor granted by the President of the United States to American inventors and innovators who have made significant contributions to the development of new and important technology. The award may be granted to a specific person, to a group of people or to an entire organization or corporation. It is the highest honor the United States can confer to a US citizen for achievements related to technological progress.

History 
The National Medal of Technology was created in 1980 by the United States Congress under the Stevenson-Wydler Technology Innovation Act. It was a bipartisan effort to foster technological innovation and the technological competitiveness of the United States in the international arena. The first National Medals of Technology were issued in 1985 by then-U.S. President Ronald Reagan to 12 individuals and one company. Among the first recipients were Steve Jobs and Stephen Wozniak, founders of Apple Computer. The medal has been awarded annually until 2015.

On August 9, 2007, President George Bush signed the America COMPETES (Creating Opportunities to Meaningfully Promote Excellence in Technology, Education, and Science) Act of 2007. The Act amended Section 16 of the Stevenson-Wydler Technology Innovation Act of 1980, changing the name of the Medal to the "National Medal of Technology and Innovation".

Award process 

Each year the Technology Administration under the U.S. Department of Commerce calls for the nomination of new candidates for the National Medal of Technology. Candidates are nominated by their peers who have direct, first-hand knowledge of the candidates achievements. Candidates may be individuals, teams of individuals (up to 4), organizations or corporations. Individuals and all members of teams nominated must be U.S. citizens and organizations and corporations must be U.S.-owned (i.e. 50% of their assets or shares must be currently held by U.S. citizens).

All nominations are referred to the National Medal of Technology Evaluation Committee which issues recommendations to the U.S. Secretary of Commerce. All nominees selected as finalists through the merit review process will be subject to an FBI security check. Information collected through the security check may be considered in the final selection of winners. The Secretary of Commerce is then able to advise the President of the United States as to which candidates ought to receive the National Medal of Technology. The new National Medal of Technology laureates are then announced by the U.S. President once the final selections have been made.

Laureates 
, there have been more than 135 individuals and 12 companies recognized. Summarized here is a list of notable laureates and a summary of their accomplishments.

See also 
 :Category:National Medal of Technology recipients
 List of general science and technology awards 
 National Medal of Arts
 National Medal of Science

References

External links 
 National Medal of Technology and Innovation official page
 National Science & Technology Medals Foundation
 List of all medal recipients

Science and technology awards
Technology and Innovation, National Medal of
Awards established in 1980
1980 establishments in the United States